Vasantnagar is a census town in Yavatmal district in the Indian state of Maharashtra.

Demographics
 India census, Vasantnagar had a population of 4117. Males constitute 54% of the population and females 46%. Vasantnagar has an average literacy rate of 56%, lower than the national average of 59.5%: male literacy is 66%, and female literacy is 45%. In Vasantnagar, 16% of the population is under 6 years of age.

The vasant Sahakari Sakhar Karkhana Ltd.,Pusad is situated in backward region of vidarbha near village Post -Pophali, in umarkhed Taluka, Dist-Yavatmal In Maharashtra State. The Factory is licensed during 1/7/1969 with a view to develop the sugarcane in the area of operation of the factory and socio-economic development of the sugarcane cultivators in the area, Late Shri.Vasantrao Naik, Former Chief Minister of Maharashtra State decided to establish a sugar factory in the cooperative sector. Under the valuable guidance of Funder Chairman Late Shri. Jethamalji Maheshwari . The factory commenced it crushing operations (1250 TCD) in 1972-73. In view of the excess planting of sugarcane in the crushing season 1994-95 and with a view to crush the entire sugarcane to avoid the financial loss of the sugarcane cultivators, Industry have expanded our plant 1250 TCD to 2500 TCD.

References

Cities and towns in Yavatmal district